Ivo Klec and Andreas Siljeström were the defending champions but chose not to compete.

Sergey Betov and Alexander Bury won the title, defeating Ivan Anikanov and Ante Pavić in the final, 6–4, 6–2.

Seeds

Draw

Draw

References
 Main Draw

2013 ATP Challenger Tour
2013 Doubles
Siberia